Point Farm, also known as the R. T. Cann House, is a historic home located at Kirkwood, New Castle County, Delaware.  It was built in 1846, and is a two-story, five bay "L"-shaped, brick dwelling with a gable roof.  It the rear is a three bay gable roofed wing. The house is in the Greek Revival style in the "Peach Mansion" form.

It was added to the National Register of Historic Places in 1982.

References

Houses on the National Register of Historic Places in Delaware
Greek Revival houses in Delaware
Houses completed in 1846
Houses in New Castle County, Delaware
National Register of Historic Places in New Castle County, Delaware